The following is a list of alumni of St. Paul's School. SPS is a preparatory, coeducational boarding school in Concord, New Hampshire, affiliated with the Episcopal Church.



A
 Robert Allerton SPS Form of 1889, philanthropist; gave Allerton Gardens on Kauai to the nation
 Michael J. Arlen, author of Exiles and Passage to Ararat (winner of the National Book Award); longtime staff writer and television critic for The New Yorker
 Norman Armour 1905, United States ambassador
 John Jacob Astor IV, member of the Astor family who died on the RMS Titanic

B
 Hobey Baker 1909, collegiate hockey player and World War I pilot
 E. Digby Baltzell 1932, sociologist responsible for popularizing the term WASP
 Matthew Winthrop Barzun, U.S. ambassador 
 Alexis I. du Pont Bayard, lieutenant governor of Delaware
 Roland W. Betts 1964, CEO of Chelsea Piers, L.P. and major Republican Party contributor
 Anthony Joseph Drexel Biddle, Jr. 1915, ambassador during World War II to eight governments in exile
Charles E. Bohlen, diplomat
 Francis Bohlen (1868–1942), Algernon Sydney Biddle professor of law at the University of Pennsylvania Law School
 James Bond, did not graduate; namesake for Ian Fleming's fictional spy
 Marshall Latham Bond, owner of sled dog inspiration of Jack London's The Call of the Wild
 Daniel Baugh Brewster, U.S. senator from Maryland

C
 Lorene Cary 1974, author of Black Ice, an autobiography detailing her experiences with the school; founder of Art Sanctuary in Philadelphia
 Francis Parkman Coffin, electrical engineering pioneer
 Parker Corning 1893, U.S. congressman from New York
 Archibald Cox 1930, Watergate Special Prosecutor
 Lacy Crawford, author of Notes on a Silencing

D
 Frank H. Davis, Vermont State Treasurer
 Clarence Day 1892, humorist, author, and playwright
 Alexis Denisof, television, film and stage actor (Angel, Buffy the Vampire Slayer)
 Harmar D. Denny, Jr., U.S. congressman from Pennsylvania
 Charles S. Dewey, U.S. congressman
 Marshall Dodge 1953, Yankee humorist
 Lucy Barzun Donnelly 1991, award-winning film and television producer
 Angier Biddle Duke, Chief of Protocol for the Kennedy administration; ambassador to El Salvador, Spain, Denmark, and Morocco
 Annie Duke, 1983, tournament poker champion, winner of the World Series of Poker Tournament of Champions (2004)

E
 The Baron Eden of Winton, 9th and 7th Bt, British Conservative politician
Grenville T. Emmet 1893, U.S. Ambassador to the Netherlands and Austria
 John Franklin Enders 1915, Nobel laureate in physiology/medicine
 William R. Everdell, historian and author

F
 Timothy Ferriss, entrepreneur and bestselling author of The 4-Hour Workweek
 Hamilton Fish, Jr. 1890, first American to die while charging San Juan Hill in the Spanish–American War 
 William Henry Furness III 1883, explorer and ethnologist

G
 James Rudolph Garfield, politician, son of President James A. Garfield
 Rufus Gifford 1992, U.S. Ambassador to Denmark
 Jeff Giuliano 1998, National Hockey League (NHL) player
 Malcolm Gordon 1887, member of the U.S. Hockey Hall of Fame
 Mark Gordon c. 1975, Wyoming state treasurer, rancher-businessman
 J. Peter Grace 1932, industrialist and sportsman
 Archibald Gracie IV, attended United States Military Academy (didn't graduate), RMS Titanic survivor, author of Titanic: A Survivor's Story
 Eliza Griswold 1991, journalist/poet, author of New York Times bestseller The Tenth Parallel: Dispatches from the Fault Line Between Christianity and Islam
 Frank Tracy Griswold III 1955, 25th Presiding Bishop of the Episcopal Church
 A. R. Gurney 1948, playwright and novelist

H
 Jeff Halpern 1994, NHL player
 Edward Harkness 1893, philanthropist after whom the Harkness table is named
 Huntington Hartford 1929, A&P heir, graduated after 8 years
 William Randolph Hearst 1881, newspaper publisher (didn't graduate)
 Kelly Heaton 1990, sculptor, seer, scientist, and spiritualist known for her combination of visual art with analog electrical engineering.
 Tommy Hitchcock, Jr. 1918, most celebrated American polo player of all time and World War I fighter-pilot (left school as president of Sixth Form)
 H. Allen Holmes 1950, U.S. Ambassador to Portugal
 Amory Houghton Sr. 1917, U.S. Ambassador to France
 Amory "Amo" Houghton Jr. 1945, U.S. congressman (R-NY); CEO of Corning Glass Works
 Clement Hurd 1926, author and illustrator of children's books, including Goodnight Moon

I

J
 Annie Jacobsen 1985, investigative journalist and New York Times bestselling author

K
 Michael Kennedy 1976, son of Robert F. Kennedy
 John Kerry 1962, U.S. senator (D-MA), 2004 Democratic presidential nominee, and 68th U.S. Secretary of State
 Shamus Khan 1996, sociologist and author
 Alan Khazei, founder of City Year
 Frederick Joseph Kinsman, ecclesiastical historian
 Sol Kumin, businessman and racehorse owner
 Benjamin Kunkel, novelist and political economist

L
 Beirne Lay, Jr. 1927, author, Twelve O'Clock High
 Howard Lederer, tournament poker champion, winner of two World Series of Poker titles, and two World Poker Tour titles
 Katherine "Katy" Lederer 1990, poet/author
 Janice Y.K. Lee 1990, New York Times bestselling author of The Piano Teacher
 John Lindsay 1940, U.S. congressman, former mayor of New York City

M
 Michel McQueen Martin 1976, journalist for ABC and NPR
 Cord Meyer, CIA official
 Rick Moody 1979, novelist, author of The Ice Storm
 Paul Moore, Jr. 1937, 13th Episcopal bishop of New York
 William Moore 1933, president and chairman of the board, Bankers Trust
 J. P. Morgan, Jr. 1884, banker and philanthropist
 Junius Spencer Morgan II 1884, banker and art collector
 Samuel Eliot Morison, author, Pulitzer Prize winner, Harvard University professor
 Robert Mueller 1962, director of the FBI 2001–13, Special Counsel in 2017 U.S. election investigation

N
 Philip Neal 1986, principal dancer for the New York City Ballet
 Francis Augustus Nelson, architect
 Judd Nelson 1978, actor, The Breakfast Club, Making the Grade

O
 Catherine Oxenberg 1979, actress

P
 Peter Pennoyer, 1975, architect, great-grandson of J. P. Morgan Jr.
Maxwell Perkins 1903, noted editor at Charles Scribner's Sons, editor of F. Scott Fitzgerald
 Harry Boone Porter, Episcopal clergyman, author, editor of The Living Church magazine
Robert Post 1928, prominent journalist and member of the Writing 69th 
 Lewis Thompson Preston 1944, President of the World Bank

Q

R
 Jonathan Reckford 1980, CEO of Habitat for Humanity
 Whitelaw Reid, Jr., 1931, Chairman of the New York Herald Tribune and The Fresh Air Fund
 Marcus T. Reynolds, 1886, prominent architect in Albany, New York
 S. Dillon Ripley, 1932, 8th Director of the Smithsonian Institution (1964 to 1984) and recipient of the Presidential Medal of Freedom
 Edmund Maurice Burke Roche, 4th Baron Fermoy 1905, Conservative MP, British Peer

S
 Charles Scribner III 1909, President of Charles Scribner's Sons
 Roger Shattuck, Proust scholar
 Alex Shoumatoff, literary journalist and environmentalist
 Lockhart Steele, 1992, blogger and journalist; founder of Curbed and former editorial director of Vox Media
 Anson Phelps Stokes II, 1896, philanthropist and Secretary of Yale University
 Anson Phelps Stokes III 1922, Episcopal Bishop of Massachusetts
 Edward L. Stokes, congressman (R) from Pennsylvania
 Nicholas Stoller, writer and director of Forgetting Sarah Marshall, Yes Man, and Get Him to the Greek
 Don Sweeney 1984, General Manager of the Boston Bruins; former NHL player

T
 William Howard Taft IV 1962, U.S. Deputy Secretary of Defense, NATO ambassador
 Van Taylor, U.S. representative from Texas
 William Davis Taylor 1950, publisher of The Boston Globe
 Charles W. Thayer, diplomat
 Augusta Read Thomas, composer of orchestral music; chair of the Board of the American Music Center
 Sir Henry Worth Thornton, President, Canadian National Railway; Vanderbilt University football coach 1894; knighted by George V
 Garry Trudeau 1966, Pulitzer Prize-winning Doonesbury cartoonist

U

V
 Alfred Gwynne Vanderbilt Jr., member of the Vanderbilt family; became a notable Thoroughbred racehorse/race track owner
 Alfred Gwynne Vanderbilt Sr., wealthy American businessman; died on the RMS Lusitania
 Cornelius Vanderbilt III
 James Vanderbilt 1994, Hollywood screenwriter

W
 David Walton 1997, television and film actor
 Owen West, U.S. military officer and writer
 Sheldon Whitehouse 1973, U.S. senator (D-RI)
Theodore Stark Wilkinson 1905, Vice-Admiral of the United States Navy during World War II
 Caroline Randall Williams 2006, poet/author, co-author of Soul Food Love
 John Gilbert Winant 1909, twice Governor of New Hampshire, U.S. Ambassador to the United Kingdom during World War II
 Owen Wister, writer
 Andrew Wylie, literary agent

X

Y

Z
 Alan "Scooter" Zackheim 2001, winner of the third season of Beauty and the Geek
 Efrem Zimbalist, Jr. 1936, film and television actor

References

Lists of American people by school affiliation
St. Paul's School